Renovo Group plc was a biopharmaceutical company, which was founded in 1998 and was headquartered in Manchester, United Kingdom. It worked in the discovery and development of drugs to reduce scarring, improve wound healing and enhance tissue regeneration. Renovo does not currently have any marketed products. It aimed "to be first to market with a scar prevention pharmaceutical drug in the US and Europe" in approximately 2014.  Following the failure of its last clinical candidate Juvista, all 100 of Renovo's staff were laid off in 2011.

Although the company stopped all pharmaceutical development it continued as a financial provider. In August 2014, Renovo Group plc was renamed Inspired Capital plc.

Products
Renovo does not currently have any marketed products. Its development pipeline currently includes one drug in phase III clinical development, two drugs in phase II clinical development, and numerous pre-clinical candidates.

References

External links
 

Biotechnology companies of the United Kingdom
Companies based in Manchester
Companies formerly listed on the London Stock Exchange
Pharmaceutical companies established in 2000
Biotechnology companies established in 2000
2000 establishments in England
2011 disestablishments in England
Pharmaceutical companies disestablished in 2011
Biotechnology companies disestablished in 2011